"Something wicked this way comes" is part of a line uttered by a witch in Act IV of William Shakespeare's play Macbeth but may also refer to:

Film and television
 Something Wicked (2014 film), a psychological thriller by Darin Scott
 Something Wicked (2017 film), a Nigerian film
 "Something Wicked" (Highlander), an episode of Highlander
 "Something Wicked" (Supernatural), an episode of Supernatural

Literature 
 Something Wicked (comics), a British horror comic published by FutureQuake Press
 Something Wicked (magazine), a horror, science fiction, and fantasy magazine
 Something Wicked (book), a 1988 book by Carolyn Hart

Music 
 Something Wicked (album), by Nuclear Assault, 1993
 "Something Wicked", a song by British Sea Power from The Decline of British Sea Power, 2003
 "Something Wicked", a song by Starset from Horizons, 2021
 "Something Wicked", a song by Tupac Shakur from 2Pacalypse Now, 1991

Other uses 
 Something Wicked, a Lockheed F-117A Nighthawk shot down in 1999 over Serbia

See also
 Something Wicked Saga, a story featured in the works of Jon Schaffer from the band Iced Earth
 Something Wicked This Way Comes (disambiguation)